Dilshad Karim Elita, better known as Elita Karim, is a Bangladeshi singer, journalist, versatile performer, anchor and voice artist. She's the wife of Ashfaque Nipun.

Early life 
Karim was born on 4 September 1982 in Dhahran the kingdom of Saudi Arabia, she completed her primary school in Bangladesh International School Dammam and high school from International Indian School, Dammam   and first came to Bangladesh in 2001, to pursue her higher studies. Elita completed her graduation in English Literature from North South University.

Career 
In 2001, Karim released her first song in a band mixed album "Amar Prithibi". In 2009, she released a song entitled 'Ontohin' with singer Mahadi. On 24 May 2015 her first solo studio album 'Elita' was released. Karim made her debut as an actor in a serial Mukim Brothers which was broadcast on Channel i based on Mostofa Sarwar Farooki's story, written and directed by Ashfaque Nipun. Her acting in the drama was praised. She is working as a journalist in a Bangladeshi English daily named The Daily Star.

In 2021, Karim earned Humphrey Fellowship at Walter Cronkite School of Journalism and Mass Communication in Arizona State University.

Personal life 
Karim married Ashfaque Nipun on 29 May 2015. Her brother Imrul Karim Emil is also a popular singer in Bangladesh. He is the vocalist of the Bangladeshi pop rock band Shunno.

Albums

Original

Mixed

References

External links
 
 

Living people
North South University alumni
Bangladeshi women journalists
21st-century Bangladeshi musicians
Best Female Singer Bachsas Award winners
Date of birth missing (living people)
Year of birth missing (living people)